Tomaszówka may refer to the following places:
Tomaszówka, Chełm County in Lublin Voivodeship (east Poland)
Tomaszówka, Lublin County in Lublin Voivodeship (east Poland)
Tomaszówka, Zamość County in Lublin Voivodeship (east Poland)
Tomaszówka, Lipsko County in Masovian Voivodeship (east-central Poland)